Adolf "Adi" Kainz (5 June 1903, in Linz – 12 July 1948) was an Austrian sprint canoeist who competed in the late 1930s. He won the gold medal in the K-2 1000 m event at the 1936 Summer Olympics in Berlin.

Kainz also won a bronze medal in the K-2 10000 m event at the 1938 ICF Canoe Sprint World Championships in Vaxholm though he competed under Germany because they had annexed Austria earlier that year.

References 
 DatabaseOlympics.com profile
 
 
 

1903 births
1948 deaths
Austrian male canoeists
Canoeists at the 1936 Summer Olympics
German male canoeists
Olympic canoeists of Austria
Olympic gold medalists for Austria
Sportspeople from Linz
Olympic medalists in canoeing
ICF Canoe Sprint World Championships medalists in kayak
Medalists at the 1936 Summer Olympics